Thermaltake Technology Co., Ltd is a Taiwanese manufacturer of PC case designs, power supplies, cooling devices and peripherals. Its main headquarters are located in Taipei, Taiwan. It has multiple manufacturing facilities in mainland China, including a major plant at Dongguan.

History
Thermaltake was founded in Taiwan in 1999. Its American headquarters were established at the same time with offices in Southern California.

Copying controversy
At Computex 2015, Thermaltake introduced two new computer cases that were very similar to Caselabs' SM8 and TH10 cases with the pedestal accessory.

Brands

Tt eSPORTS 

Thermaltake delivers a series of gaming mice, computer keyboards and other peripherals targeted towards competitive gamers through the Tt eSports brand. Tt eSPORTS also sponsors a variety of eSports teams and streamers across the world.

LUXA2 
In 2009, Thermaltake launched a mobile accessory brand called LUXA2.

See also
 List of companies of Taiwan
Antec
Cooler Master
Corsair
Deep Cool
FSP Group
Lian Li
NZXT
PCCooler
SilverStone Technology
Zalman

References

External links 
 
 TteSPORTS official website
 LUXA2 official website
 Thermaltake official Community Forum

Computer enclosure companies
Computer power supply unit manufacturers
Electronics companies of Taiwan
Taiwanese brands
Taiwanese companies established in 1999
Companies based in Taipei
Companies based in New Taipei
Computer hardware cooling
Companies listed on the Taipei Exchange